Grove–Linden–St. John's Historic District is a national historic district in Ridgewood, Queens, New York.  It includes 51 contributing buildings built between 1908 and 1910.  They consist of three story brick tenements with two apartments per floor.  There are also a number of two- and three-story row houses with one apartment per floor.  The buildings feature Romanesque Revival style detailing.

It was listed on the National Register of Historic Places in 1983.

Gallery

References

Romanesque Revival architecture in New York City
Ridgewood, Queens
Historic districts on the National Register of Historic Places in Queens, New York
Historic districts in Queens, New York